Fosazepam is a drug which is a benzodiazepine derivative; it is a water soluble derivative of diazepam. It has sedative and anxiolytic effects, and is a derivative of diazepam which has been substituted with a dimethylphosphoryl group to improve solubility in water.

Fosazepam has similar effects on sleep as other benzodiazepines. In a clinical trial it was reported that fosazepam to lead to increased sleep duration with less broken sleep but sleep quality was worsened with suppressed deep sleep and increased light sleep. Adverse effects included feelings of impaired morning vitality and upon discontinuing the drug benzodiazepine withdrawal symptoms of anxiety, impaired concentration and impaired morning vitality were experienced. Another clinical trial also found worsening of sleep while on benzodiazepines as well as during withdrawal with suppression of deep sleep stages including REM sleep, with increased light sleep upon withdrawal. The main metabolites of fosazepam are 3-hydroxyfosazepam and the active metabolite desmethyldiazepam which has a very long elimination half-life of about 3 days. Tolerance to the hypnotic effects of fosazepam starts to develop after about 7 days of use. Due to the very long elimination half-life of the active metabolite of fosazepam it is not recommended for use as a hypnotic. The main pharmacological effects of fosazepam may be due to its metabolite nordiazepam (desmethyldiazepam), rather than the parent drug. The long-acting active metabolite nordazepam can cause extended sedative effects at high doses or with prolonged use, and may produce residual sedation upon awakening.

Fosazepam is of relatively low potency compared to other benzodiazepine derivatives, with a 100 mg dose of fosazepam equivalent to 10 mg of nitrazepam. 60 mg of fosazepam has also been estimated to be equivalent to about 5–10 mg of diazepam. Fosazepam has similar effects to nitrazepam, but with a shorter duration of action and less tendency to cause over sedation, motor-impairment, amnesia, rebound insomnia, and morning grogginess.

See also 
Benzodiazepine

References 

Benzodiazepines
Chloroarenes
GABAA receptor positive allosteric modulators
Lactams